This is a list of premiers of the province of British Columbia in order of time served in office as premiers as of . The preceding premier retains the office during an election campaign, and that time is included in the total. Mandates listed below are defined as election victories for a given premier, with zero mandates listed for premiers appointed during the course of a parliament, but either failing to win the subsequent election or resign before the parliament dissolves.

Notes

British Columbia, premiers

Premiers